Clathrina arabica is a species of calcareous sponge from Oman.

References
World Register of Marine Species entry

Sponges described in 1872
Fauna of Oman